Nicole Sullivan (born April 21, 1970) is an American actress and comedian best known for her six seasons (1995–2001) on the sketch comedy series MADtv. She also played Holly Shumpert in five seasons (2001–2005, 2007) of the CBS sitcom The King of Queens.

Sullivan played the recurring character of Jill Tracy on Scrubs. She voiced heroic Mira Nova in Disney/Pixar's Buzz Lightyear of Star Command and the villainous Shego in Disney Channel's Kim Possible. She had recurring voice roles on Family Guy and voiced Franny Robinson in Disney's Meet the Robinsons. From 2008 to 2009, she starred in and was the lead of her own Lifetime television series Rita Rocks. From 2008 to 2013, she voiced Marlene the Otter in The Penguins of Madagascar. She played Jules' (Courteney Cox) therapist, Lynn Mettler, on the comedy Cougar Town. She portrayed Lyla in the Disney Channel movie Let It Shine in 2012. In 2013, she starred in the short-lived Nickelodeon sitcom Wendell & Vinnie as Wilma Basset. From 2014 to 2022, she portrayed Janine, the Johnsons' next-door neighbor, on the ABC sitcom Black-ish. She also voiced Kara Danvers aka Supergirl in DC Super Hero Girls.

Early life
Sullivan was born in Manhattan on April 21, 1970. She took dance classes at age 7 and performed in Off Broadway and Broadway productions with the First All-Children's Theatre. Sullivan's mother Madonna (Rauscher) Sullivan, a businesswoman, and her father Edward C. Sullivan, who represented Manhattan's 69th district in the New York State Assembly from 1977 to 2002, moved the family upstate to Middleburgh, New York, in 1982. During high school, Nicole was class treasurer throughout her junior year. She played soccer in high school, recorded statistics for the boys' basketball team and was a member of student council.

After graduating from Middleburgh in 1987, she attended Northwestern University as a theatre major. She worked two jobs to pay her way through college and writing plays and sketches for the student theatre. Sullivan spent her junior year in London, studying at the British American Drama Academy and became a member of the Greenwich Shakespeare Company. Sullivan graduated from Northwestern and then moved to Los Angeles to start a television career. After appearing in commercials and sporadic guest roles on shows including Herman's Head, she was recruited to join the cast of MADtv.

Career

MADtv
Sullivan was among the original cast members on MADtv when it premiered in 1995. She created numerous characters; her most popular was the mean-spirited Vancome Lady. Sullivan's other characters included X-News reporter Amy, dimwitted Antonia, Eracists leader Debbie, News at 6'''s Diane Lawyer-Trabajo (pronounced "trebalyo"), racist country singer Darlene McBride, and Latina bimbo Lida. Sullivan appeared with Michael McDonald in a MADtv sketch about making an audition tape to appear on Law & Order that mocked their acting prowess; she later guest-starred in the Law & Order: Special Victims Unit season one episode "Contact". Sullivan was featured in the November/December 2009 issue of Making Music Magazine.

King of Queens
Sullivan played the role of Holly Shumpert from 2001 to 2005. She returned in 2007 to reprise the role for the final season. In most of the show, Holly's profession is a dog walker. The Heffernans hire her to 'walk' Arthur, Carries' father, to get him some exercise and keep him out of mischief, at least a bit.

Voice acting projects
Sullivan was originally cast as Turanga Leela, one of the main characters in the animated series Futurama, but the role was recast with Katey Sagal before the show went to air.

Sullivan has voiced Marlene the Otter on The Penguins of Madagascar – the first television series of the Madagascar franchise – which aired on Nickelodeon, Shego on Kim Possible; Joan of Arc on Clone High; Mira Nova on Buzz Lightyear of Star Command; and Joan on the Family Guy episode, "I Take Thee Quagmire", along with several other one time voices on the show. Sullivan has also starred in a pilot called Me and My Needs that was rejected by ABC. She played Franny Robinson in Meet the Robinsons. Also, Sullivan was a voice actor in the Monsters, Inc. video game. She played Luna in the 2007 video game Ratchet & Clank: Size Matters. In 2012, she also provided the voice of Supergirl in Super Best Friends Forever, a series of animated shorts which aired on Cartoon Network's DC Nation block. with the role carrying on to television series DC Super Hero Girls, which led to appearances on Teen Titans Go! and a direct-to-video crossover film Teen Titans Go! & DC Superhero Girls: Mayhem in the Multiverse, which was released on May 24, 2022.

Personal life
Sullivan is married to actor Jason Packham. They have two sons, born May 2007 and August 2009.

Sullivan won the first edition of Celebrity Poker Showdown.  Her charity was Alley Cat Allies, a nonprofit advocacy organization dedicated to transforming communities to protect and improve the lives of cats, which received $100,000 as a result of her victory.

Sullivan also made an appearance in an episode of It's Me or the Dog'' along with her husband, their then twenty-month-old son Dashel (Dash), their three cats, and their four mixed-breed dogs: Paco (a Chihuahua mix), Jackson (a Lab mix), Donut (a Great Pyrenees mix), and Funzies (a Catahoula Leopard mix).

Filmography

Film

Television

Video games

References

External links

Nicole Sullivan's video interview with The Futon Critic

1970 births
Living people
Actresses from New York (state)
Alumni of the British American Drama Academy
American film actresses
American impressionists (entertainers)
American poker players
American sketch comedians
American television actresses
American video game actresses
American voice actresses
American women comedians
Comedians from New York (state)
Northwestern University School of Communication alumni
People from Manhattan
People from Middleburgh, New York
20th-century American actresses
21st-century American actresses
20th-century American comedians
21st-century American comedians